Michel Laclotte (Saint Malo, France, 27 October 1929 – Montauban, 10 August 2021) was a French art historian and museum director, specialising in 14th and 15th century Italian and French painting.

Early life and education 

Laclotte's father, Pierre was a lawyer who died in 1940 fighting in the Second World War. His mother, Hugette (de Kermabon) took Michele and his sister to occupied Paris in 1941. He attended the lycée Henri-IV, then studied at the Sorbonne and the École du Louvre, and while still a student, began working at the museum as an intern in 1951. In 1952, he was appointed to lead a team to catalog works of art recovered or repatriated from looting during the war.

Career 

In 1965 he was appointed by Culture Minister André Malraux as the chief curator of the paintings department of the Louvre, succeeding Germain Bazin. He was also a professor at the École du Louvre.

From 1972, he championed the idea of turning Paris's gare d'Orsay into a museum, now the Musée d'Orsay. From 1978 he led the team that worked on the future museum's curatorial program until its opening in 1986. He was also influential in the creation of the Musée du Petit Palais in Avignon, which opened in 1976.

He was involved in the Grand Louvre project from its inception in 1981, and defended the design choice of the Louvre Pyramid. He was subsequently appointed the Louvre's Director in 1987, and in 1992 became the first  of the newly created , a position he held until his retirement in 1994. He also directed the  journal between 1988 and 1991.

Laclotte was also instrumental in the creation of France's Institut National d'Histoire de l'Art from 1995 to 2002, and led one of the new institute's main research projects, a catalogue of Italian paintings in French public collections, following its establishment in 2001.

Main publications 
Histoires de musées: Souvenirs d'un conservateur (Scala, 2003) . English translation, A Key to the Louvre: Memoirs of a Curator (Abbeville, 2004) .
L'art e l'esprit de Paris (SEUIL, 2003) . English translation, The Art and Spirit of Paris (Abbeville, 2003) 
L'école d'Avignon (Flammarion, 1983) .

He was also a contributor to many books on the history of painting, including
 Exposition de peinture hollandaise provenant ... du Musée du Louvre (exposition, musée de Tourcoing, décembre 1953), Tourcoing : Musée, 1953
 De Giotto à Bellini : les primitifs italiens dans les musées de France (exposition, Paris, musée de l'Orangerie, 1956), Paris: Éditions des Musées nationaux, 1956
 (avec Ch. Sterling, O. Raggio, S. Béguin) Exposition de la collection Robert Lehman (Paris, musée de l'Orangerie, 1957), Paris: Éd. des musées nationaux, 1957
 (préface de A. Blunt) The Age of Louis XIV (exposition, Londres, Royal Academy of arts, 1958), London: Royal Academy of arts, 1958
 Le XVIIe siècle français. Chefs-d'œuvre des musées de province, Paris: Les Presses artistiques, 1958
 L'Ecole d'Avignon: la peinture en Provence aux XIVe et XVe siècles, Paris: Gonthier-Seghers, 1960
 Trésors de la peinture espagnole: églises et musées de France (exposition, Paris, musée des Arts décoratifs, janv.–avr. 1963), Paris: Ministère d'État Affaires culturelles, 1963
 Primitifs français, Paris: Hachette [1966]
 Ingres (exposition, Paris, musée du Petit Palais, 27 octobre 1967–29 janvier 1968), Paris: Réunion des musées nationaux, 1967
 Musée du Louvre. Peintures, Paris: Flammarion, 1969
 (dir.) Dictionnaire des grands peintres, Paris: Larousse, 1970. Rééd. 1983, 1989, 1991.
 Avignon, Musée du Petit Palais: peinture italienne, Paris: Éditions des Musées nationaux, 1976
 (avec S. Béguin et C. Ressort) Retables italiens du XIIIe au XVe siècle (exposition, Paris, Musée national du Louvre, 14 octobre 1977–15 janvier 1978), Paris : Réunion des musées nationaux, 1978
 (avec J.-P. Cuzin) Petit Larousse de la peinture, Paris: Larousse, 1979
 (avec J.-P. Cuzin) Le Louvre: la peinture européenne, Paris: Éditions Scala, 1982
 (avec D. Thiébaut) L'École d'Avignon, Paris : Flammarion, 1983
 (collectif) Dictionnaire de la peinture, Paris : Larousse, 1987. Rééd. 1989, 1993, 1996, 1999, 2003
 (avec J.-P. Cuzin et S. Ottani Cavina), Mélanges en hommage à Pierre Rosenberg: peintures et dessins en France et en Italie, XVIIe-XVIIIe siècles, Paris: Réunion des Musées Nationaux, 2001
 (avec M. Phéline) L'art et l'esprit de Paris, Paris : Seuil, 2003
 Histoires de musées : Souvenirs d'un conservateur, Paris: Scala, 2003
 Mantegna à Mantoue, coll. « Découvertes Gallimard Hors série », Paris: Gallimard, 2008
 (collectif) Figures de la réalité : caravagesques français, Georges de La Tour, les frères Le Nain..., Paris: Hazan-INHA, 2010
Dictionnaire de la peinture from Éditions Larousse

See also
 Charles Sterling
 André Chastel
 Pierre Rosenberg
 Henri Loyrette

References

External links

 The André Malraux Foundation

1929 births
2021 deaths
French art historians
Directors of the Louvre
French male non-fiction writers
20th-century French historians
20th-century French male writers
21st-century French historians
21st-century French male writers
Lycée Henri-IV alumni
Paris-Sorbonne University alumni
École du Louvre alumni
Writers from Saint-Malo